Rhytidophyllum is a genus of plant in family Gesneriaceae, native to the Caribbean islands and northern South America.

Species
 Rhytidophyllum acunae
 Rhytidophyllum asperum
 Rhytidophyllum auriculatum
 Rhytidophyllum berteroanum
 Rhytidophyllum bicolor
 Rhytidophyllum caribaeum
 Rhytidophyllum coccineum
 Rhytidophyllum crenulatum
 Rhytidophyllum cumanense
 Rhytidophyllum earlei
 Rhytidophyllum exsertum
 Rhytidophyllum floribundum
 Rhytidophyllum grande
 Rhytidophyllum humboldtii
 Rhytidophyllum intermedium
 Rhytidophyllum lanatum
 Rhytidophyllum leucomallon
 Rhytidophyllum leucomallum
 Rhytidophyllum lomense
 Rhytidophyllum melastoma
 Rhytidophyllum minus
 Rhytidophyllum mogoticola
 Rhytidophyllum onacaense
 Rhytidophyllum oerstedii
 Rhytidophyllum petiolare
 Rhytidophyllum plumerianum
 Rhytidophyllum prasinatum
 Rhytidophyllum purpureum
 Rhytidophyllum rhodocalyx
 Rhytidophyllum rupincola
 Rhytidophyllum stipulare
 Rhytidophyllum tigridia
 Rhytidophyllum tomentosum
 Rhytidophyllum vernicosum
 Rhytidophyllum villosulum
 Rhytidophyllum wrightianum

References

External links

 GBIF entry
 Melville Thurston Cook, "The Embryology of Rhytidophyllum", Bulletin of the Torrey Botanical Club, volume 35, 1908, pages 179-183.

 
Gesneriaceae genera